Felix the Cat is a cartoon character created in the silent era by Pat Sullivan and Otto Messmer.

Felix the Cat may also refer to:

 Felix the Cat (TV series), the 1950s TV series created by Joe Oriolo featuring Felix
 Felix the Cat: The Movie, a 1988 movie based on the classic cartoon and TV series
 Felix the Cat (video game), a 1992 video game based on the cartoon
 Felix the Cat (mascot), the oldest high school mascot in Indiana, for Logansport High School

People
 Félix Potvin or Félix "the Cat" Potvin (born 1971), retired NHL goaltender
 Felix da Housecat (born 1971), American DJ

See also
 Felix the Cat's Cartoon Toolbox, a 1994 computer application, including characters from the TV show
 The Twisted Tales of Felix the Cat, a 1995 TV series developed by Don Oriolo
 Baby Felix, a 2000 anime series featuring infant versions of the TV characters